Hinda is a small town in the Republic of the Congo.  It is the seat of the Kouilou Department.

Transport 
It is served by a station on the Congo-Ocean Railway.

See also 
 Railway stations in Congo

References 

Populated places in the Republic of the Congo